The Burgomaster of Stilemonde is a 1929 British silent drama film directed by George Banfield and starring John Martin Harvey, Fern Andra and Robert Andrews. It was made at Walthamstow Studios and on location in Belgium. It was based on the 1918 play Le Bourgmestre de Stilmonde  by Maurice Maeterlinck. Like the play, it portrays German atrocities during the First World War occupation of Belgium. It was well received by critics.

Cast
 John Martin Harvey as Cyrille van Belle (The Burgomaster)
 Fern Andra as Isabelle Hilmer
 Robert Andrews as Lt. Otto Hilmer
 John F. Hamilton as Odilion van Belle
 Fred Raynham as Baron von Rochow
 Wilfred Shine as Claus
 A. B. Imeson as Capt. Karl von Shernberg
 Oswald Lingard as Father de Coninck
 Kinsey Peile as Sheriff Vermandel
 Mickey Brantford as Flores
 Adeline Hayden Coffin
 C. V. France

References

Bibliography

External links

1929 films
1920s war drama films
British war drama films
Films based on works by Maurice Maeterlinck
Films directed by George Banfield
British silent feature films
Films shot at Walthamstow Studios
Films set in Belgium
British World War I films
Films set in the 1910s
Belgium in World War I
British black-and-white films
1929 drama films
1920s English-language films
1920s British films
Silent war drama films